Jon Normile (born July 20, 1967) is an American fencer. He competed in the individual épée event at the 1992 Summer Olympics.

He fenced for the Columbia Lions fencing team. Normile graduated from Columbia University with a B.S. in civil engineering in 1989. He was inducted into the Columbia Athletics Hall of Fame in 2006.

See also
List of USFA Division I National Champions

References

External links
 

1967 births
Living people
American male épée fencers
Olympic fencers of the United States
Fencers at the 1992 Summer Olympics
Sportspeople from Cleveland
Pan American Games medalists in fencing
Pan American Games silver medalists for the United States
Pan American Games bronze medalists for the United States
Fencers at the 1991 Pan American Games
Columbia Lions fencers
Medalists at the 1991 Pan American Games